Tectonin beta-propeller repeat containing 1 is a protein that in humans is encoded by the TECPR1 gene.

Function

This gene encodes a tethering factor involved in autophagy. The encoded protein is found at autolysosomes, and is involved in targeting protein aggregates, damaged mitochondria, and bacterial pathogens for autophagy

References

Further reading